Pellaea andromedifolia, with the common names coffee cliffbrake and coffee fern, is a species of cliff brake fern in the Cheilanthoideae subfamily of the Pteridaceae. It is native to California in the United States and Baja California in Mexico.

Description
This plant does not have the immediately recognizable sharply pointed leaflets on its fronds that many other ferns have. Its leaves bear rounded or oval-shaped segments widely spaced along the rachis. Each segment may curl under along its edges. The leaves are green when new, then turn red, purplish, or brown.

Some individuals of this species are diploid and reproduce sexually, while some are triploid or tetraploid and reproduce by apogamy (growth of a plant from a gamete without fertilization).

Habitat
Pellaea andromedifolia is found on dry slopes in coastal, Mojave Desert, and California chaparral and woodlands habitats. It is able to take long periods without water, when it will shrivel and appear dead.  Then shortly after rainfall new growth appears quickly from the ground.  It is not crown forming, but spreading slowly and forming clumps.

References

External links
Jepson Manual Treatment - Pellaea andromedifolia
Pellaea andromedifolia - Photo gallery
USDA Plants Profile; Pellaea andromedifolia

andromedifolia
Ferns of California
Flora of Baja California
Flora of the California desert regions
Flora of the Sierra Nevada (United States)
Natural history of the California chaparral and woodlands
Natural history of the California Coast Ranges
Natural history of the Channel Islands of California
Natural history of the Peninsular Ranges
Natural history of the San Francisco Bay Area
Natural history of the Santa Monica Mountains
Natural history of the Transverse Ranges